Mark Oliver Roosnupp (born 12 May 1997) is an Estonian professional footballer who plays as a midfielder for Serbian Superliga club Napredak Kruševac and the Estonia national team.

Club career
On 4 January 2023 it was announced that Roosnupp would join Serbian Superliga club Napredak Kruševac on a 1,5 year deal.

International career
Roosnupp made his senior international debut for Estonia on 19 November 2017, replacing Rauno Sappinen in the 60th minute of a 2–0 away win over Fiji in a friendly.

Honours
FCI Levadia
Estonian Cup: 2017–18
Estonian Supercup: 2015, 2018

References

External links

1997 births
Living people
Footballers from Tallinn
Estonian footballers
Association football midfielders
Esiliiga players
FCI Levadia U21 players
Meistriliiga players
FCI Levadia Tallinn players
Paide Linnameeskond players
Estonia youth international footballers
Estonia under-21 international footballers
Estonia international footballers
Estonian expatriate footballers
Expatriate footballers in Serbia
Estonian expatriate sportspeople in Serbia
FC Nõmme United players